Spring Grove Farm and Distillery is a historic farm complex and distillery site located at Antrim Township in Franklin County, Pennsylvania, USA. The house was built in 1867, and is a two-story, "T"-shaped, brick dwelling in the Greek Revival style. Also on the property are a contributing two-story, four bay brick building believed to have housed a cooper's shop and residence, brick summer kitchen, brick smoke house, frame pumphouse, large brick end bank barn with a slate roof, frame wagon shed, brick carriage house, stone mill (1803) and the site of the Spring Grove Distillery. The distiller ceased to operate in 1920.

It was listed on the National Register of Historic Places in 1979.

References 

Farms on the National Register of Historic Places in Pennsylvania
Greek Revival houses in Pennsylvania
Houses completed in 1867
Houses in Franklin County, Pennsylvania
National Register of Historic Places in Franklin County, Pennsylvania
Distilleries on the National Register of Historic Places
Distilleries in Pennsylvania